Roundwood Park School is a mixed, 11-18 secondary school with academy status situated in Harpenden, Hertfordshire, UK. Opened in 1956, it currently has around 1300 pupils, most of whom live in the local area and surrounding villages (e.g. Markyate, Southdown, Whitwell, Kimpton, Flamstead, Redbourn, Breachwood Green and Wheathampstead.) At the beginning of 2011, Roundwood (along with Sir John Lawes School, the University of Hertfordshire, and Rothamsted Research) formed a charitable trust. St George's School joined the trust in 2013 and it is now known as "The Harpenden Secondary Schools Trust".

Academics
It runs a full curriculum, including all standard subjects as well as vocational subjects for Sixth Form students.  The current headteacher is Mr Alan Henshall. He was preceded by Nicholas Daymond.

Facilities
The construction of a new modern 'Maths and Music' block was finished in October 2008, which was opened by Johnny Ball.

The school has a multimillion-pound sports centre, officially opened on 7 September 2011 by Mike Atherton. The sports centre is also used for children's parties and sports clubs outside school hours.

The construction of an all-weather outdoor football pitch was announced in 2016 and was completed in 2018.

Houses 
At the beginning of the 2011 academic year, the school introduced a house system as an Olympic legacy. The houses were originally named after colours, but in June 2012, the current house names were unveiled. The houses also represent two charities, a national charity and a local charity. Each house has a charity week where money is raised for these two charities.
 Grey-Thompson (Blue)
 Wilberforce (Red)
 Frank (Pink)
 Scott (Green)
 Cadbury (Purple)
 Owens (Yellow)
 Mandela (Orange)

Notable alumni 
 Ralph Adams-Hale, rugby player
 Edward Corrie, tennis player
 Joanna Dennehy, spree killer
 Natasha Dowie, football striker
 Seline Hizli, actress
 Rhys James, comedian
 Sarah McKenna, rugby player
 Richie Driss, Blue Peter presenter

References

External links 
School website

Academies in Hertfordshire
Harpenden
Secondary schools in Hertfordshire
1956 establishments in England
Educational institutions established in 1956